Kniseh  is a Syrian village located in Muhambal Nahiyah in Ariha District, Idlib.  According to the Syria Central Bureau of Statistics (CBS), Kniseh had a population of 2373 in the 2004 census.

References 

Populated places in Ariha District